F1 ROC II: Race of Champions, originally released in Japan as , is a 1993 racing video game developed and published by SETA Corporation for the Super Nintendo Entertainment System. It is the sequel to F1 ROC: Race of Champions, and similarly features Formula One licensing. Unlike that game, F1 ROC II was not released in Europe.

Gameplay

Gameplay is mostly like the first F1 ROC, though this game features a new system of handling that greatly resembles later F-ZERO games; normal turning is 'ice'-like, and tapping the accelerator (referred to as 'boost turning' in F-ZERO) corrects the vehicle.

The game's career structure is no longer simply a Formula One season, and is now similar to games like the PC Engine version of F1 Dream or Formula One: Built to Win; starting from smaller local races, one progresses through the Group C division, Formula 3000, and finally Formula One.

Once the player reaches the Formula One part, things change. First, they must choose one of three teams: Footwork, Larrousse, and Benetton. Second, the season's tracks must be done in order, instead of being able to choose or even re-race a track like in the earlier divisions. Third, this part uses a season standings system in addition to keeping the times of individual races; the object of the game changes from simply winning the races to acquiring as many points as possible in order to win the championship. Finally, the game becomes more punishing: hitting obstacles, frequent usage of the pit stop, and other careless mistakes will destroy championship hopes just like in the real Formula One.

Development

The hardware of F1 ROC II features the ST010 (also known as the NEC µPD96050) DSP chip, which is used for general functions and for handling the intelligence of the computer cars. The chip presumably allowed computer-controlled drivers to perform realistically aggressive maneuvers, emulating the speed and accuracy of real Formula One drivers, considered a rarity at the time.

However, the chip's program ROM was eventually extracted, where it was found that only a fraction of the chip's space was used for these specific instructions, and that the algorithms themselves were relatively simple.

Reception
GamePro acknowledged F1 ROC II's large amount of content, smooth control, and the innovative mechanics fueled by the game's custom DSP chip, but rated the overall game as "only above-average", citing poor sound effects and a lack of detail in the car graphics.

References

External links

Exhaust Heat II at Centre for Computing History

1993 video games
Formula One video games
SETA Corporation games
Super Nintendo Entertainment System games
Super Nintendo Entertainment System-only games
Video game sequels
Video games developed in Japan